Rudlin Torah Academy is a coed Jewish private day school located in Richmond, Virginia. It serves Elementary school and Middle School students from kindergarten to eighth grade. This school is a member of the Virginia Association of Independent Schools.
The school is small with only about 100 students per year. They teach Torah for all ages and have programs that fit all students.

External links
 

Private middle schools in Virginia
Private elementary schools in Virginia
Schools in Richmond, Virginia
Jewish day schools in the United States
Private K–8 schools in the United States